Washington Heights may refer to:

Places

Japan 
Washington Heights (Tokyo), a former US Army barracks and housing area during the occupation of Japan

United States 
Washington Heights, Chicago, Illinois
Washington Heights, East Brunswick, New Jersey
Washington Heights, Manhattan, New York City, New York
Washington Heights, Walkill, New York
Washington Heights, Roanoke, Virginia
Washington Heights, Milwaukee, Wisconsin
Washington Heights Historic District, Washington, D.C.

Other uses 
Washington Heights (film), a 2003 film set in Washington Heights, Manhattan
Washington Heights (TV series), an MTV reality show